{{DISPLAYTITLE:C6428H9912N1694O1987S46}}
The molecular formula C6428H9912N1694O1987S46 (molar mass: 144190.3 g/mol) may refer to:

 Adalimumab
 Infliximab